Trusnov is a municipality and village in Pardubice District in the Pardubice Region of the Czech Republic. It has about 200 inhabitants.

Administrative parts
Villages of Franclina, Opočno and Žíka are administrative parts of Trusnov.

References

External links

Villages in Pardubice District